The 2011 Denver mayoral election took place on May 3 and June 7, 2011, to elect the Mayor of Denver.  It led to a run-off election on June 7, 2011, which was won by Michael Hancock.

On January 12, 2011, Guillermo "Bill" Vidal was sworn in as Mayor of Denver, Colorado after John Hickenlooper resigned to be sworn in as the 42nd Governor of Colorado. Vidal was not a candidate in the election. Vidal served as mayor until July 2011. The preliminary election was held on May 3, 2011, and the general election was on June 7, 2011, between Senator Chris Romer and City Councilman Michael B. Hancock.

Candidates
The major candidates were:

 Carol Boigon, at-large member of the Denver City Council 
 Michael B. Hancock, District 11 member of the Denver City Council
 Doug Linkhart,  at-large member of the Denver City Council
 Danny F. Lopez, Public Works employee and 2007 Mayoral candidate
 James Mejia, founding CEO of the Denver Preschool Program
 Chris Romer, Democratic state Senator
 Kenneth R. Simpson
 Theresa Spahn, former director of the University of Denver's Sandra Day O'Connor Judicial Selective Initiative
 Thomas Andrew Wolf, lawyer
 Jeff Peckman
 Marcus Giavanni, write-in candidate

Polling

Results

External links
 Denver Mayoral Election Scorecard

References

Denver
2011
Mayoral elections in Denver
2011 Colorado elections